Ahmose, son of Ebana, served in the Egyptian military under the pharaohs Ahmose I, Amenhotep I, and Thutmose I. His autobiography has survived and is intact on the wall of his tomb and has proven a valuable source of information on the late 17th Dynasty and the early 18th Dynasty of Egypt.

Ahmose was born in the city of Nekheb, the modern El Kab. During the war to expel the Hyksos from Egypt, in the reign of Seqenenre Tao, his father enlisted in the navy. After the deaths of Tao and his son Kamose, Ahmose began to serve as a soldier under Pharaoh Ahmose I. He participated in the battle of Avaris (the Hyksos capital in the Delta), where he killed two Hyksos and was awarded the "gold of valor" twice. Ahmose was awarded slaves and other spoils by the pharaoh after Avaris was sacked.
Ahmose also participated in the three-year siege of Sharuhen in southern Canaan for which he was rewarded. He followed his king to Nubia, where they put down three rebellions.

Under Amenhotep I, he fought against the Nubians and was given gold and slaves for his bravery.

During the reign of Thutmose I, Ahmose participated in a naval campaign against Nubian tribes in the Nile valley and was appointed admiral. He also followed Thutmose on a campaign against Naharin all the way to the Euphrates River.

Ebana was the name of Ahmose's mother (and probably a very important woman); his father's name was Baba. Paheri, the grandson of Ahmose and a scribe and priest of the goddess Nekhbet and tutor to the prince Wadjmose, supervised the building of his grandfather's tomb.

References 
 "Biography of Ahmose, son of Ebana" in Ancient Records of Egypt by James Henry Breasted, Part Two, sections 1 to 24, 38ff and 78ff.
 "The Autobiography of Ahmose Son of Abana" in Ancient Egyptian Literature by M. Lichtheim, vol.2, pp. 12ff.

External links 

 The biographical inscriptions of Ahmose son of Ebana
 Autobiography of Ahmose, in Lepsius, Denkmäler III, 12d.
The Autobiography of Ahmose, Son of Ebana (English Translation)

Ancient Egyptian soldiers
Officials of the Eighteenth Dynasty of Egypt
Ancient Egyptian autobiographies
Ahmose I
Amenhotep I
Thutmose I